These are the films shown at the 5th New York Underground Film Festival, held from March 18–22, 1998.

See also
 New York Underground Film Festival site

New York Underground Film Festival
Underground Film Festival
1998 film festivals
1998 in American cinema
1998 festivals in the United States